Bur (also Romanized as Būr) is a village in Darbandrud Rural District, in the Central District of Asadabad County, Hamadan Province, Iran. At the 2006 census, its population was 27, in 4 families.

References 

Populated places in Asadabad County